Amity University, Kolkata is a private university in Kolkata in the state of West Bengal, India. It was founded in 2015 and is the eighth, university to be established by the Amity Education Group.

History
The Amity Group's was established in Kolkata in 2009 with Amity Global Business School (Salt Lake, Sector V), which offered management degrees under Amity University. In 2015, the state legislature of West Bengal passed the Amity University Act, 2014 (West Bengal Act, XXIV of 2014) to enable the establishment of the university in Kadampari, Action Area - III of New Town. The university was established on 6 January and classes commenced on 31 August 2015. It is the eighth university to be established by the Amity Education Group, which also established Amity University, Mumbai in 2014.

Campus

The Central Building (known as the Leaf Structure) consists of a library block, an auditorium block, a cafeteria block and an atrium.

The Academic Block which consists of three wings comprises more than 100 classrooms It has the university's common seminar hall and is next to the sports field and basketball court. A 22-Storey Tower ( E Block) is an addition to the academic building and features more than 200 classrooms, seminar hall, research labs and other amenities room. The university also possess a 13-Storey Hostel Block which provide Residential Living to Boys and Girls separately.

Organization and administration

School of Engineering & Technology
School of Engineering & Technology is called as Amity School of Engineering & Technology, Kolkata (ASETK). All engineering programs are run under School of Engineering & Technology. It offers UG, PG & Ph.D. programmes. The different Programmes running under this school are,

Undergraduate Programme 
 B.Tech. in Computer Science Engineering
 B.Tech. in Civil Engineering
 B.Tech. in Electronics and Communication Engineering
 B.Tech.  in Mechanical & Automation Engineering
 B.Tech. in Biotechnology

Post Graduate Programme
 M.Tech. in Computer Science Engineering
 M.Tech. in Electronics and Communication Engineering
 M.Tech.  in Mechanical Engineering
 Post Graduate Diploma in Solar Energy

Amity Law School
Amity Law School Kolkata is affiliated to Amity University Kolkata. All the law programs are run under the Amity Law School. It offers UG and PG programs. The programs running under the school are:

Undergraduate Programme
 BBA. LLB. (Hons) 5-year course
 BCom. LLB. (Hons) 5-year course
 BA. LLB. (Hons) 5-year course

Post Graduate Programme
 LLB 3 Year Course
 LLM (Business Law) 1 year Course

Research centres
The university has 11 research centres in bio-design, computer graphics, decisions and ethics, design research, information technology, financial analytics, robotics, computer research in music and acoustics, humanities, language and information, applied & behavioral sciences.

Institutes
The university has more than 25 institutes in its campus, including Amity School of Business, Kolkata, Amity Business School, Amity School of Engineering & Technology, Amity School of Communication, Amity School of Architecture and Planning, Amity Law School, Kolkata and Amity Institute of Biotechnology.

References

External links

Universities in Kolkata
Educational institutions established in 2015
Commerce colleges in India
2015 establishments in West Bengal
Private universities in India
Business schools in Kolkata